Governor Sprague may refer to:

Charles A. Sprague (1887–1969), 22nd Governor of Oregon
William Sprague III (1799–1856), 14th Governor of Rhode Island
William Sprague IV (1830–1915), 27th Governor of Rhode Island, nephew of William Sprague III